Katavi may refer to:
 Katavi, Mawal, Pune district, Maharashtra, India
 Katavi Region, Tanzania
 Katavi National Park, Tanzania